Dos Palos (Spanish for "Two Timbers") is a city in Merced County, California, United States. The population was 5,798 at the 2020 census, up from 4,950 at the 2010 census.

Geography

History
In one of his expeditions during the 1820s along the west side of the San Joaquin Valley, explorer Gabriel Moraga reported the location of two large isolated poplar trees, which he called "Dos Palos". In 19th-century Spanish usage, palos was used to describe tall pole-like trees or "timbers". 21st-century usage often translates it as "sticks". The "Rancho Sanjon de Santa Rita" Mexican land grant cites "Los Dos Palos" or "The Two Trees" as a boundary marker.

In 1891, former school superintendent Bernhard Marks convinced cattle ranch king Henry Miller to develop a small town nearby. They gave it the name "Dos Palos Colony" but pronounced it with their ethnic accents (Marks a Polish Jew and Miller an Alsatian German) as "Dahce Palace". This pronunciation remained for over one hundred years until a recent Spanish pronunciation revival. Marks brought forty pioneer families west from Iowa and Nebraska to establish the community. In 1892, unable to find good water, many of the settlers left. Marks convinced Miller to establish another town two miles away on land unsuitable for farming and ranching due to swamps and unsettling soils. Some of the settlers relocated. This new town was named "Colony Center". In 1906, Dos Palos Colony was renamed South Dos Palos and Colony Center was renamed Dos Palos. The Post Office was briefly misspelled as one word, "Dospalos" but this was changed within a year. About a dozen of the colony's original families still reside locally. Through the years, people from many other locations joined the community. Dos Palos incorporated in 1935.

On January 1, 2008,  surrounding the community of Dos Palos were transferred from Fresno County to Merced County.

Demographics

2010
At the 2010 census Dos Palos had a population of 4,950. The racial makeup of Dos Palos was 3,377 (68.2%) White, 167 (3.4%) African American, 62 (1.3%) Native American, 37 (0.7%) Asian, 4 (0.1%) Pacific Islander, 1,075 (21.7%) from other races, and 228 (4.6%) from two or more races. Hispanic or Latino of any race were 3,075 persons (62.1%).

The census reported that 4,922 people (99.4% of the population) lived in households, no one lived in non-institutionalized group quarters and 28 (0.6%) were institutionalized.

There were 1,501 households, 731 (48.7%) had children under the age of 18 living in them, 816 (54.4%) were opposite-sex married couples living together, 232 (15.5%) had a female householder with no husband present, 130 (8.7%) had a male householder with no wife present. There were 119 (7.9%) unmarried opposite-sex partnerships, and 7 (0.5%) same-sex married couples or partnerships. 261 households (17.4%) were one person and 116 (7.7%) had someone living alone who was 65 or older. The average household size was 3.28. There were 1,178 families (78.5% of households); the average family size was 3.69.

The age distribution was 1,571 people (31.7%) under the age of 18, 532 people (10.7%) aged 18 to 24, 1,199 people (24.2%) aged 25 to 44, 1,114 people (22.5%) aged 45 to 64, and 534 people (10.8%) who were 65 or older. The median age was 31.3 years. For every 100 females, there were 96.1 males. For every 100 females age 18 and over, there were 96.1 males.

There were 1,700 housing units at an average density of 1,259.5 per square mile, of the occupied units 929 (61.9%) were owner-occupied and 572 (38.1%) were rented. The homeowner vacancy rate was 3.2%; the rental vacancy rate was 8.9%. 2,955 people (59.7% of the population) lived in owner-occupied housing units and 1,967 people (39.7%) lived in rental housing units.

2000
At the 2000 census there were 4,581 people in 1,424 households, including 1,116 families, in the city. The racial makeup of the city was 39.80% White, 4.15% Black or African American, 1.38% Native American, 0.61% Asian.54.18% of the population were Hispanic or Latino of any race.
Of the 1,424 households 45.6% had children under the age of 18 living with them, 58.5% were married couples living together, 14.7% had a female householder with no husband present, and 21.6% were non-families. 18.7% of households were one person and 8.8% were one person aged 65 or older. The average household size was 3.20 and the average family size was 3.63.

The age distribution was 34.9% under the age of 18, 8.8% from 18 to 24, 26.8% from 25 to 44, 19.0% from 45 to 64, and 10.4% 65 or older. The median age was 30 years. For every 100 females, there were 97.5 males. For every 100 females age 18 and over, there were 92.4 males.

The median income for a household in the city was $29,147, and the median family income was $35,906. Males had a median income of $30,568 versus $20,960 for females. The per capita income for the city was $13,163. About 19.1% of families and 22.8% of the population were below the poverty line, including 31.9% of those under age 18 and 10.9% of those aged 65 and over.

Government

Members of the Dos Palos City Council serve four year terms. The 92nd and current panel consists of:
 Mayor April Hogue, term ends November 20, 2024 
 Mayor Pro Tem Debbie Orlando, term ends November 15, 2022
 Councilmember Armando Bravo, term ends November 20, 2024
 Councilmember Thomas Pigg, term ends November 15, 2022
 Councilmember Marcus Porter, term ends November 20, 2024.

Notable people
 Ana Isabel de Alba, lawyer and judge
 Myron Joseph Cotta, bishop, Diocese of Stockton
 Malcolm "Ike" Frankian, NFL football player with New York Giants, coach of Los Angeles Bulldogs, coach at Dos Palos High School
 Dave Henderson, MLB baseball outfielder for Oakland A's and four other teams
 Shawn Hillegas, MLB baseball pitcher for Oakland A's and four other teams
 Cody Martin, MLB pitcher for the Oakland A's and two other teams

References

External links
 

Cities in Merced County, California
Incorporated cities and towns in California
1935 establishments in California